Until the Day is the only studio album released by Nonchalant, released on March 26, 1996 via MCA Records.

Background
Most of the album's production was handled by a three-man production team that consisted of Antoine "Bam" Macon, Kapin and Lonnie, though Chucky Thompson of Sean "Puffy" Combs' Hitmen production team also contributed production for two songs. Nonchalant's lyrics dealt with topics ranging from racism ("Lights N' Sirens"), relationships ("Lookin' Good to Me") and anti-violence (5 O'clock).

The album is perhaps best known for its lead single "5 O'Clock", which peaked at No. 24 on the Billboard 200 and earned a gold certification from the Recording Industry Association of America for sales of over 500,000 copies on May 1, 1996. A follow-up single entitled "Until the Day" achieved minor success, making it to both the R&B and rap charts.

Reception

Alex Henderson of Allmusic gave the album four stars out of a possible five, saying "Until the Day is an album that, for the most part, is as solid lyrically as it is musically and rhythmically. The R&B-drenched tracks are consistently appealing, and Nonchalant's lyrics are memorable whether she's rapping about relationships or addressing socio-political concerns"

Commercially, the album did not fare as well. Though "5 O'clock" was successful, the album did not match the success of its lead single. It peaked at 94 on the Billboard 200 and 20 on the Top R&B/Hip-Hop Albums, spending six weeks on the former and 10 weeks on the latter.

Track listing
"Intro"- 1:54 
"It's All Love"- 4:59 
"Crab Rappers"- 4:28 
"5 O'clock" (featuring Drecia Vega & Bink Woods Dre) - 4:47 
"Lookin' Good to Me"- 4:27 
"Kickin' It with Non"- :50 
"Have a Good Time"- 4:53 
"Lights N' Sirens"- 4:15 
"Non"- 1:31
"Until the Day"- 4:44 
"Mr. Good Stuff"- 5:04 
"Thank You"- 4:23 
"Outro"- 1:32

Charts

Personnel 

Charles "Prince Charles" Alexander - Mixing 
Bill Appleberry - Engineer 
Quasim Baptiste - Rap 
Stefan Campbell - Stylist 
Danny Clinch - Photography 
Chris Gehringer - Mastering 
Kenny J. Gravillis - Art Direction, Design 
Barry James - Guitar 
Doug Johnson - Engineer

Chris Murphy - Engineer 
Mark Murray - Producer 
Nonchalant - Vocals  
Ken Schubert - Engineer, Mixing 
Al Simmons - Guitar, Producer 
DeWayne Staten - Producer 
Chucky Thompson - Multi Instruments, Producer, Mixing 
Joshua Wertheimer - Assistant Engineer

References

1996 debut albums
MCA Records albums